"Blood on the Dance Floor x Dangerous (The White Panda Mash-Up)", often shortened to just "Blood on the Dance Floor x Dangerous", is a song by American recording artist Michael Jackson. A mashup by The White Panda, it was released digitally on September 6, 2017 in promotion of Jackson's posthumous compilation album Scream.

Background and release
In September 2017, Sony Music Entertainment announced that a compilation album entitled Scream would be released on September 29, 2017.

On September 6, 2017, for the promotion of the album, the track "Blood on the Dance Floor x Dangerous (The White Panda Mash-up)" premiered via Shazam worldwide. On the same day, it became the lead single for the album as a digital download at iTunes and Amazon. It was also released on the majority Chinese music streaming platforms Tencent and NetEase Music the same day.

It is a mash-up composed of five songs by Michael and The Jacksons—"Blood on the Dance Floor", "Dangerous", "This Place Hotel", "Leave Me Alone" and "Is It Scary" remixed by dance music duo White Panda.

Critical reception
Ben Beaumont-Thomas from The Guardian said the song was "fascinatingly awkward" in its presentation.

Commercial performance
The song did not appear in majority music charts in 2017. In December 2017, it was released for club play in the United States, The song debuted at number 47 on the Billboard Dance Club Songs chart on February 10, 2018, and became the 25th song by Jackson to appear on the chart.

Track listing

Charts

References

External links
Genius: Blood on the Dance Floor x Dangerous - Lyrics

2017 songs
Michael Jackson songs
Songs written by Michael Jackson
Song recordings produced by Michael Jackson
Songs released posthumously
Songs written by Jimmy Jam and Terry Lewis
Songs written by Bill Bottrell
Songs written by Teddy Riley